Cheese in the Trap is a 2018 South Korean romantic drama film starring Park Hae-jin, Oh Yeon-seo and Park Ki-woong, based on the Korean webtoon of the same name. It was released on March 14, 2018.

Plot 
Hong Seol (Oh Yeon-seo) is an ordinary university student. She is busy working part-time jobs to pay for her tuition fee and living expenses. Yoo Jung (Park Hae-Jin) is her senior at the same university. He seems perfect. He comes from a wealthy family, he is kind and handsome, but Hong Seol does not feel comfortable with Yoo Jung. Suddenly, Yoo Jung comes and talks to her. He wants to go out on a date and they begin an awkward relationship.

Cast 
Park Hae-jin as Yoo Jung 
Oh Yeon-seo as Hong Seol
Park Ki-woong as Baek In-ho
Yoo In-young as Baek In-ha
Sandara Park as Jang Bo-ra
Kim Hyun-jin as Kwon Eun-taek
Oh Jong-hyuk as Oh Young-gon
Moon Ji-yoon as Kim Sang-cheol
Lee Jung-hyuk as Student
Go Min-si as Female junior

Production
The production was first announced in March 2016, and confirmed Park Hae-jin's return to reprise his role as Yoo Jung. It was announced that Kim Go-eun, the lead actress of the television adaptation, was not offered a role and a new actress would be sought. The Korean-Chinese production team held open casting auditions for the female lead in advance of shooting, which was scheduled to commence in early 2017. In August, it was announced that Oh Yeon-seo was cast as the female lead.

Filming officially commenced in April 2017.

Release
The trailer of Cheese in the Trap was released on February 13, 2018 and it accumulated more than 2.4 million views within the first week.

On March 7, 2018, a press conference was held at CGV Yongsan-gu, Seoul. The main cast together with the director were present at the event.

The film premiered exclusively in CGV theatres on March 14, 2018.

Controversy on distribution and release
Due to the fact that Cheese in the Trap was released exclusively on CGV theatres, some Korean movie organizations questioned if that was showing "deepening monopoly" of the CJ Group-owned movie theatre chain. They also condemned the "double standard" of the management of the film's distributor, Little Big Pictures. The company was founded in 2013 by a consortium of producers and organizations that condemned the so-called "monopolistic and/or oligopolistic practices" of CGV and its sister company CJ E&M, Lotte Group's Lotte Cinema and Lotte Entertainment, Orion Group's Showbox, and JoongAng Media Network's Megabox.

Responding to the criticisms, Little Big Pictures CEO Kwon Ji-won said that "the exclusive release of Cheese in the Trap on CGV theatres were part of the company's distribution strategy".

Reception
According to Korean Film Council, Cheese in the Trap came in third place at the local box office on its opening day by attracting 32,805 moviegoers. The film was shown 1,636 times on 346 screens in CGV theatres.

During the first weekend since the film was released, it drew 106,196 viewers and placed in top five at the weekend box office.

References

External links
 

2018 films
2010s Korean-language films
South Korean romantic drama films
2018 romantic drama films
Films based on South Korean webtoons
Little Big Pictures films
2010s South Korean films